Ian Dominic McInerney (born 26 January 1964) is a former professional footballer, who played for Newcastle Blue Star, Huddersfield Town, Stockport County, Rochdale (loan), Morecambe, Runcorn, Halifax Town and Leigh RMI.

References

1964 births
Living people
English footballers
Association football midfielders
English Football League players
Huddersfield Town A.F.C. players
Stockport County F.C. players
Rochdale A.F.C. players
Morecambe F.C. players
Footballers from Liverpool
Newcastle Blue Star F.C. players